All India Institute of Medical Sciences, Guwahati (AIIMS Guwahati) is a public medical school and hospital based in Changsari (near Guwahati), Assam, India, and one of the All India Institutes of Medical Sciences (AIIMSs). On 26 May 2017, Honorable Prime Minister Shri.Narendra Modi laid the foundation stone of the Institute. The institute has an annual intake of 100 MBBS students. The academic activity for the first batch of 50 MBBS students started in January 2021.

Academics 
The academic programme for the first batch of MBBS students was inaugurated on 12 January 2021 by the then Honorable Union Minister for Health and Family Welfare Dr.Harsh Vardhan. The Institute became operational with 50 MBBS students, and is one of the four AIIMSs to become operational in academic year 2020-21. The Institute was initially functioning from a temporary campus at Narakasur Hilltop of Gauhati Medical College, with AIIMS Bhubaneswar mentoring it. The Institute has shifted to its permanent campus in March 2022.

Patient Services 
The Institute will have a 750-bedded hospital with more than 25 specialty and super-specialty departments. This is apart from the outpatient services and the diagnostic services. There will also be a separate facility for providing services under AYUSH.

References

All India Institutes of Medical Sciences
Medical colleges in Assam
2021 establishments in Assam
Educational institutions established in 2021
Education in Guwahati